Ttukseom Station is a station on the Seoul Subway Line 2.

It is located in Seongsu-dong, Seongdong-gu, Seoul, and is near Seoul Forest.

Station layout

References

Seoul Metropolitan Subway stations
Railway stations opened in 1983
Metro stations in Seongdong District
1983 establishments in South Korea
20th-century architecture in South Korea